John Litei Nkamasiai (born 2 June 1983) is a Kenyan middle distance runner. He was the bronze medalist of Men's 800 metres at the 2006 Commonwealth Games.

He is one of the coaches of Global Sports Communications, a management that manages Eliud Kipchoge. Being a sprinter himself, he has excelled in coaching track athletes. Among athletes he train is world junior record holder in 1500m Ronald Kwemoi  samuel chebole among other young athletes.

External links

1983 births
Living people
Kenyan male middle-distance runners
Athletes (track and field) at the 2006 Commonwealth Games
Commonwealth Games bronze medallists for Kenya
Commonwealth Games medallists in athletics
Place of birth missing (living people)
Medallists at the 2006 Commonwealth Games